The 2022 Atlas 100 was the 14th stock car race of the 2022 ARCA Menards Series season, and the 40th iteration of the event. The race was held on Sunday, August 21, 2022, in Springfield, Illinois at the Illinois State Fairgrounds Racetrack, a 1-mile (1.6 km) permanent oval-shaped dirt track. The race was decreased from 100 laps to 73 laps, due to time constraints with the Disturbed concert. In a dominating fashion, Jesse Love, driving for Venturini Motorsports, would lead every single lap, and earn his second career ARCA Menards Series win, and his first of the season. To fill out the podium, Buddy Kofoid, driving for Venturini Motorsports, and Ryan Unzicker, driving for Hendren Motorsports, would finish 2nd and 3rd, respectively.

The race was marred following a crash on the last lap. On the final lap, teammates Jesse Love and Buddy Kofoid were battling for the lead. On the straightaway, Bryce Haugeberg had hit the outside wall, causing him to stall on the track. The leaders entered the straightway. Love was able to avoid Haugeberg by moving to the inside of the track. Kofoid did not see Haugeberg because of a windshield glare and a dust pickup. Kofoid slammed into the back of Haugeberg's car, causing it to flip on its side. Both drivers were able to get out under their own power. Kofoid was credited with a 2nd-place finish, and Haugeberg was credited with a 10th-place finish.

Background 
Illinois State Fairgrounds Racetrack is a one mile long clay oval motor racetrack on the Illinois State Fairgrounds in Springfield, the state capital. It is frequently nicknamed The Springfield Mile. Constructed in the late 19th century and reconstructed in 1927, the track has hosted competitive auto racing since 1910, making it one of the oldest speedways in the United States. The original mile track utilized the current frontstretch and the other side was behind the current grandstands and the straightaways were connected by tight turns. It is the oldest track to continually host national championship dirt track racing, holding its first national championship race in 1934 under the American Automobile Association banner.  It is the home of five world records for automobile racing, making it one of the fastest dirt tracks in the world. Since 1993, the venue is managed by Bob Sargent's Track Enterprises.

Entry list 

 (R) denotes rookie driver

Practice/Qualifying 
Practice and qualifying were both cancelled due to inclement weather. The starting lineup would be determined by owner points. As a result, Jesse Love, driving for Venturini Motorsports, would take the pole.

Race results

Standings after the race 

Drivers' Championship standings

Note: Only the first 10 positions are included for the driver standings.

References

External links 

2022 ARCA Menards Series
Atlas 100
2022 in sports in Illinois